Edinburgh North and Leith may refer to:

Edinburgh North and Leith (Scottish Parliament constituency)
Edinburgh North and Leith (UK Parliament constituency)